École Française de Téhéran (EFT) is a French international school located in Tehran, Iran. It is at Gholhak Garden, the British embassy residential complex, in the Gholhak area.

It serves from the maternelle (preschool) level, up to the lycée (senior high school) level. As of 2011 it had 256 students, including foreigners and Iranians. The school is on the property of the British Embassy.

It closed after the 2011 attack on the British Embassy in Iran; the attack occurred while the school was in session.

However, the school has since reopened

References

External links

  École Française de Téhéran
  École française de Téhéran - Embassy of France in Iran

International schools in Tehran
Buildings and structures in Tehran
Tehran
France–Iran relations
High schools in Iran
Educational institutions established in 1995
1995 establishments in Iran